Barrio is a Spanish word for a district or neighborhood.

Barrio or Barrios may also refer to:

 Barrio (surname), a family name and persons with it
 Barrios, a family name and persons with it
 Barrio (Álava), a village in Álava, Valdegovia, Spain
 Barrio (Teverga), a civil parish of Teverga, Asturias, Spain
 Barrio (film), a 1998 Spanish film
 Barrio (song), a song by Mahmood

See also